Guillaume André d'Hébert (15 January 1653, Paris – 6 May 1725) was Governor General of Pondicherry for two periods. He was preceded by Pierre Dulivier and succeeded by Pierre André Prévost de La Prévostière .

Titles

References

1653 births
1725 deaths
Governors of French India
French colonial governors and administrators
Politicians from Paris